HMNZS Tarapunga was a modified Moa class inshore patrol vessel of the Royal New Zealand Navy (RNZN).

She was built by 1980 by the Whangarei Engineering and Construction Company as a version re-engineered for use as an inshore survey vessel.

After decommissioning, she was purchased by North American owners and can be seen in Harper's Island Episode 1, as the charter boat that brings the wedding party to the island.
Can also be seen in season 2, episode 9, of Psych, from 2007.

See also
 Survey ships of the Royal New Zealand Navy

References

Survey ships of the Royal New Zealand Navy
Moa-class patrol boats
1980 ships